Rajshekhar Basu (better known by the pen name Parashuram; 16 March 1880 – 27 April 1960) was a Bengali chemist, author and lexicographer. He was chiefly known for his comic and satirical short stories, and is considered the greatest Bengali humorist of the 20th century. He was awarded the Padma Bhushan in 1956.

Early life
Basu was born at his maternal uncle's home at Bamunpara near Kandorsona, British India  (now  Purba Bardhaman district of West Bengal, India).  He was the second son (and sixth child) of Chandrasekhar Basu and Lakshmimani Devi. His father, who belonged to the Basu family of Birnagar in Nadia District of West Bengal, was the Dewan Darbhanga Raj. Rajshekhar spent his childhood in Darbhanga, in the state of Bihar, and learned to speak Hindi as a first language, rather than Bengali. He was an inquisitive child and manifested a knack for science early in life. Shashisekhar, his elder brother, later wrote that the young Rajshekhar put together a laboratory at home equipped with two cupboards of various chemicals; he would forecast the weather by looking at a barometer that he had hung on the wall, would write prescriptions of cough-mixtures for his family members, and later, would even go to the Temple Medical School to dissect corpses.

Basu was introduced to Bengali literature when he went to Patna to study for the F.A. degree, where he interacted with a number of Bengali speakers. After school, he moved to Calcutta and joined Presidency College, where he completed his BA and MA degrees in chemistry. After graduating he completed a degree in law as well, but only attended court for three days, after which he quit the legal profession for good, and decided to pursue a career in science.

Around this time, he met Acharya Prafulla Chandra Roy, who had recently started a company – Bengal Chemicals & Pharmaceuticals. In 1903, Basu joined the company as a chemist. He was very quickly promoted to the post of director, and began a long association with the company, which continued even after his retirement in 1932.

Literary career

Basu began his writing career in the 1920s. He adopted the pen name of "Parashuram" while writing humorous pieces for a monthly magazine. The name was not, apparently, a homage to the Parashurama of mythology. In fact, Basu simply borrowed the surname of someone at hand, the family goldsmith, Tarachand Parashuram. His first book of stories, Gaddalika, was published in 1924 and drew praise from such personalities as Rabindranath Tagore.

In 1937, when he published Chalantika, a monolingual Bengali dictionary, Rabindranath commented:

"At long last, we have a dictionary for Bengali. The concise grammar for Bengali that you have included in the appendix is also wonderful."

Chalantika also included Basu's first efforts to reform and rationalise Bengali orthography. A few years before its publication, in 1935, Calcutta University formed a committee, chaired by him, to formulate a set of guidelines governing the spelling of Bengali words. The recommendations of this committee were broadly accepted, and Chalantika is still in use today.

Basu's collection of short stories, Anandibai Ityadi Galpa, won a Sahitya Akademi Award for Bengali literature in 1958. The book was published under his pen name, Parasuram, and contained fifteen satirical stories, touching on themes of love, courtship, families, and politics.

Other achievements
Basu was a man of diverse achievements. He was an active member of the National Council of Education, founded in 1903. He served on the Bangiya Sahitya Parishad. He even provided covert assistance to the revolutionaries of the Indian Independence Movement in the form of money and chemicals, and also provided his expertise in making bombs.

Basu also played a major role in the history of printing in Bengal. He was the principal assistant to Sureshchandra Majumdar, credited with creating the first linotype in the Bengali script. The second edition of Parashuram's Hanumaaner Svapna Ityadi Galpa was the first book to be completely printed in Bengali linotype.

Awards and honours

Basu received a good deal of recognition for his writing. Calcutta University awarded him the Jagattarini and Sarojini medals in 1940 and 1945 respectively. In 1957, the University awarded him D.Litt. Jadavpur University followed suit the next year. Krishnakali ityadi golpo won the Rabindra Puraskar in 1955, and in 1956, he was awarded the Padma Bhushan. In 1958, he was awarded the Akademi Puraskar for Anandibai Ityadi Galpa.

Personal life

Basu was married and had one daughter. He suffered a great deal of tragedy in his personal life. His son-in-law died of a terminal illness at a very young age, and his heartbroken daughter died the same day. In 1942, he lost his wife as well. He lived for almost 18 years after his wife's demise and wrote a great deal during this time, but he did not allow his personal tragedies to colour his writing. Even after a debilitating stroke in 1959, he continued writing. On 27 April 1960, he suffered a second stroke while he was resting and died in his sleep.

Rajshekhar's younger brother, Girindrasekhar Bose (1887–1953), was an early Freudian psychoanalyst of the non-Western world, and also wrote books for children.

Works

Dictionary
 Chalantika (1937)

Short stories
 Sri Sri Siddheswari Limited (1922)
 Gaddalika (1922)
 Kajjali (1927)
 Hanumaner Svapna Ityadi Galpa(1937)
 Galpakalpa (1950)
 Dhusturi Maya Ityadi Galpa
 Krishnakali Ityadi Galpa (1953)
 Nil Tara Ityadi Galpa
 Anandibai Ityadi Galpa (1957)
 Chamatkumari Ityadi Galpa
  Asmani choti
 Jaliyat

Translations
 Kalidaser Meghdut (1943)
 Valmiki Ramayan (1946)
 Krishnadvaipayan Vyas krita Mahabharat (1949)
 Hitopadesher Galpa (1950)
 Shrimadbhagabat Gita

Collection of essays
 Laghuguru (1939)
 Bharater Khanij (1943)
 Kutir Shilpa (1943)
 Bichinta (1955)
 Chalachchinta

Poetry
 Parashuramer Kabita (published posthumously)

Screen adaptations
 Two Bengali movies, both directed by Satyajit Ray, were based on short stories by Parashuram. These were Parash Pathar ( (The philosopher's stone)), based on the story of the same name; and Mahapurush ( (The holy man)), based on the short story Birinchibaba.
 In the film Chaar, one story (Bateswarer Abodan) is written by Rajshekhar Basu. The film is directed by Sandip Ray.

References

External links
Rajsekhar Bose Section in Parabaas
Rajsekhar Bose Section in Abasar

1880 births
1960 deaths
20th-century Bengalis
19th-century Bengalis
Presidency University, Kolkata alumni
Bengali-language writers
Bengali Hindus
Brahmos
Writers from West Bengal
Recipients of the Padma Bhushan in literature & education
Recipients of the Rabindra Puraskar
Recipients of the Sahitya Akademi Award in Bengali
University of Calcutta alumni
People from Purba Bardhaman district
20th-century Indian translators
20th-century Indian essayists
20th-century Indian short story writers
19th-century Indian translators
20th-century Indian writers
20th-century Indian male writers
Indian male writers
Indian writers
Indian short story writers
Indian male short story writers
Indian essayists
Indian male essayists
Indian translators
Indian non-fiction writers
Indian male non-fiction writers
20th-century Indian non-fiction writers
Indian chemists
20th-century Indian chemists
Indian comedy writers
Indian lexicographers
Indian humorists
Indian satirists
Indian science writers
Scientists from British India
Writers in British India